Greg Cheney is an American politician. He is the member for the 18th district (Position 2) in the Washington House of Representatives.

Life and career 
Cheney was a lawyer.

In August 2022, Cheney defeated Brad Benton and John Ley in the non-partisan primary election for Position 2 for the 18th district of the Washington House of Representatives. In November 2022, he defeated Duncan Camacho in the general election, winning 54 percent of the votes. He succeeded Larry Hoff. He assumed office in 2023.

References 

Living people
Place of birth missing (living people)
Year of birth missing (living people)
Republican Party members of the Washington House of Representatives
21st-century American politicians
Washington (state) lawyers